Nummela Palloseura (abbreviated NuPS) is a sports club from Nummela in Vihti, Finland. The club was formed in 1964 and since the outset football has been the dominant sport.  NuPS runs around 30 teams with men's, women's and junior sections.  In addition the club runs leagues and tournaments, outside activities for infants, developmental activities for disabled children and general fitness football for players of all ages.

In 2008 the club had around 625 registered players and in 2009 this increased to 700 players (750 players when peripheral football activities are included).  In total NuPS's teams play around 700 games every year.

History
The inaugural meeting of the club took place on 14 October 1964 when it was decided to establish an Ice hockey rink at the Nummelan sports ground.  NuPS joined the Finnish Ice Hockey Association and in the spring of 1965 joined the Finnish Football League.   Other ball games within NuPS's remit at that time included field hockey, volleyball, basketball, tennis, squash and table tennis. However the sport of football dominated, the expansion of the football club being linked to the population growth of Vihti municipality.

Season to season

Infrastructure
Nummela has good conditions for football with:

 3 x grass pitches (full size)
 1 x artificial pitch (full size)
 1 x gravel pitch (full size)
 5 x gravel pitches (for small-sided games)
 1 x hall in winter (full size with artificial turf)

Club Structure
For the current season NuPS are running 2 men's teams, 1 veterans men's team, 2 ladies teams, 1 veterans ladies team, 12 boys teams and 5 girls teams.

2010 season
NuPS First Team are competing in Section 1 (Lohko 1) of the Kolmonen administered by the Helsinki SPL and Uusimaa SPL. This is the fourth highest tier in the Finnish football system.

 NuPS Reserves are participating in Section 1 (Lohko 1) of the Nelonen administered by the Uusimaa SPL.

Men's First Team Players

Sources and references
Official Website
Suomen Cup
NuPS Facebook

Football clubs in Finland
1964 establishments in Finland